The Beit Yaacov Synagogue is a synagogue in Punta del Este, Uruguay. 

This synagogue, with a central location, is mostly attended by Sephardi Jews.

See also
 List of synagogues in Uruguay

References

Punta del Este
Sephardi Jewish culture in Uruguay
Sephardi synagogues
Synagogues in Maldonado Department
Buildings and structures in Punta del Este